Johan Georg Raeder (1889–1959) was a Norwegian ophthalmologist known for his studies on glaucoma. The Raeder's syndrome, a lesion of the middle cranial fossa, was named after him.

References
 

1889 births
1959 deaths
Norwegian ophthalmologists